Mushie is a town in Mai-Ndombe province, Democratic Republic of the Congo and is the administrative center of Mushie territory. It lies at an elevation of 1118 ft (340 m), on the northern bank of the Kasai River at its confluence with the Fimi River. Mushie's population is roughly 33,000. Mushie was the birthplace of the celebrated Congolese musician Papa Wendo. The town is served by Mushie Airport.

References 

Populated places in Mai-Ndombe Province